The Alliance of Social Democrats was a political party in Iceland.

History
The party was established in 1983 by Vilmundur Gylfason, as a breakaway from the Social Democratic Party. It won four seats in the Althing in the April elections that year, although Gylfason committed suicide in the Althing later that year. The party lost all four seats in the 1987 elections, with its vote share falling from 7.3% to just 0.2%.

References

Defunct political parties in Iceland
Political parties established in 1983
1983 establishments in Iceland
Political parties with year of disestablishment missing